Happy Holiday is a 1955 Christmas album of Christmas songs and carols by Jo Stafford, accompanied by her husband Paul Weston and his orchestra. The entire family participated in the creation of this album; young Tim Weston is the small boy on the cover. Stafford is also joined by The Starlighters for vocal background, just as she was after her version of The Chesterfield Supper Club moved to Hollywood.

Track listing 

 "Happy Holiday" 
 "Winter Weather" 
 "The Christmas Song" 
 "Let It Snow! Let It Snow! Let It Snow!"       
 "Toyland"
 "March of the Toys"      
 "Winter Wonderland" 
 "'Twas the Night Before Christmas"      
 "I Wonder as I Wander"
 "O Little Town of Bethlehem"       
 "Silent Night"
 "Happy Holiday" (reprise)

References 

Christmas albums by American artists
Jo Stafford albums
1955 Christmas albums
Columbia Records Christmas albums
Covers albums
Albums conducted by Paul Weston
Albums arranged by Paul Weston
Pop Christmas albums